Wilhelm Orbach (1894, Offenbach am Main – 1944, Auschwitz) was a German chess master. He was murdered in the Holocaust.

He took 3rd at Oeynhausen 1922 (22nd DSB–Congress, B tourn); took 4th at Frankfurt 1923 (23rd DSB–Congress, B tourn); tied for 3rd-4th at Breslau 1925 (24th DSB–Congress, B tourn); won at Frankfurt am Main 1925 (City championship); took 2nd at Ems 1926 (Quadrangular).

Orbach won at Hyères 1927; took 4th at Homburg 1927 (Efim Bogoljubow won); tied for 4-5th at Giessen 1928 (Richard Réti won); took 11th at Duisburg 1929 (26th DSB–Congress, Carl Ahues won); took 12th at Frankfurt 1930 (Aron Nimzowitsch won);
took 6th at Paris (L'Echiquier) 1938 (Baldur Hoenlinger won).

He was murdered in the Auschwitz concentration camp.

References

1894 births
1944 deaths
German chess players
Jewish chess players
German civilians killed in World War II
German people who died in Auschwitz concentration camp
Sportspeople from Offenbach am Main
German Jews who died in the Holocaust
20th-century chess players